Igor Gaudi (born 10 Apr 1975) is a former professional tennis player from Italy.

Career
Gaudi competed in the San Marino three times. In 1995 and 1999 he took part in the singles and in 1999 he played in the doubles, with Giorgio Galimberti. He didn't register a win in any tournament.

After winning his final qualification match over Vincenzo Santopadre, in five sets, Gaudi made it into the main draw of the 2000 Wimbledon Championships, where he was beaten in the opening round by Moroccan Hicham Arazi.

He tested positive for Norandrosterone in early 2003 and was suspended by the Italian Tennis Federation.

Challenger titles

Singles: (1)

Doubles: (2)

References

External links
 
 

1975 births
Living people
Italian male tennis players
Sportspeople from Rimini